Yenicə (also, Yenidzha) is a village in the Yevlakh Rayon of Azerbaijan. The village forms part of the municipality of Aşağı Bucaq.

Notes

References

Populated places in Yevlakh District